Satwinder Bitti is a Punjabi singer of Punjab, India. She was a national-level hockey player and later adapted singing as profession. In 2011, she judged a singing reality show, Awaaz Punjab Di, by a Punjabi TV channel mh1.

Early life 

Bitti was born in a Punjabi Sikh family, to father S. Gurnaib Singh and mother Gurcharan Kaur. Her father, retired from PWD, Patiala, also had an interest in music and taught her the basics of music. She used to sing religious songs on different devotional functions and thus started singing at a very early age of five. She is the fan of the singer Lata Mangeshkar and later, took singing as a profession and released many religious and folk albums. She has done a BSc. (non-medical) from MCM DAV College, Chandigarh Sec-36 and was a national-level hockey player.

In June 2016 Bitti joined Indian National Congress in presence of party's state chief Amarinder Singh and senior leaders.

Career 
She started her singing career with the album, Pure Dee Hawa.

Discography 

 Pure Di Hawa
 Ik Vari Hass Ke
 Nachdi De Siron Patase
 Chandi Dian Jhanjran
 Nachna Patola Banke
 Dil De Mareez
 Giddhe Ch Gulabo Nachdi
 Mar Gayee Tere Te
 Main Ni Mangna Karauna
 Nachdi Main Nachdi
 Pardesi Dhola
 Sabar
 Khand Da Khedna
 Ve Sajjna

Religious 

 Dhann Teri Sikhi
 Roohan Rabb Dian
 Nishan Khalse De
 Mae Ni Main Singh Sajna
 Sikhi khandeyo Tikhi

References 

Punjabi-language singers
Punjabi people
Living people
1975 births